Coláiste Mhuire is an Irish-language mixed catholic secondary school in Dublin, Republic of Ireland.

From 1933 to 2002 the school was based at Parnell Square in central Dublin before moving to its new campus in Cabra.

History
The school was established in Harcourt Street, Dublin 1931 by the Irish Christian Brothers. It moved to Parnell Square, Dublin two years later expanding to other buildings on the north-western corner of the Square. 

Originally an all-boys school, in the 1990s the school began to accept girls for the first time.

In 2002, the school relocated to a new campus in Cabra in view of the poor condition of the Parnell Square buildings.

In 2007, the school began operating under the trusteeship of the Edmund Rice Schools Trust.

Academics
The school offers a broad curriculum and a range of extracurricular activities. The school provides the Junior Certificate, an optional Transition Year (TY) programme, the Leaving Certificate Vocational Programme (LCVP) and the established Leaving Certificate.

Pupils from the school won the overall prize at the Young Scientist and Technology Exhibition in 1972 and 1977.

Extracurricular 
The school has a debating society.

Notable alumni

P. J. Mara (1942-2016) - public affairs consultant; advisor to Charles Haughey
Alan Dukes (born 1945) - Fine Gael politician; government minister
Cathal Mac Coille (born 1952) - broadcaster and journalist
Des Cahill (born 1959) - sports broadcaster

References

Secondary schools in Dublin (city)
Educational institutions established in 1931
1931 establishments in Ireland